The 2004–05 Honduran Liga Nacional was the 40th season in the Honduran football top division; it determined the 46th and 47th national champions in the league's history.

2004–05 teams

 Atlético Olanchano (Catacamas)  
 Marathón (San Pedro Sula)
 Motagua (Tegucigalpa)
 Olimpia (Tegucigalpa)
 Platense (Puerto Cortes)
 Real España (San Pedro Sula)
 Universidad (Danlí)
 Municipal Valencia (Choluteca)
 Victoria (La Ceiba)
 Vida (La Ceiba)
 Note: Both Universidad and Valencia are from Tegucigalpa but had to play their home matches at Danlí and Choluteca respectively.

Apertura

Regular season

Standings

Results table

Final round

Semifinals

Olimpia vs Victoria

 Olimpia won 11–3 on aggregate score.

Marathón vs Real España

 Marathón won 3–2 on aggregate score.

Final

Olimpia vs Marathón

 Marathón won 5–3 on aggregate score.

}

Squads

Top goalscorers
 As of 19 December 2004
16 goals
  Luciano Emílio (Olimpia)
14 goals
  Eduardo Bennett (Victoria)
11 goals
  Luis Ramírez (Victoria)
10 goals
  Ney Costa (Atlético Olanchano)
9 goals
  Wilmer Velásquez (Olimpia)
8 goals
  Edgardo Simovic (Marathón)
7 goals

  Pedro Santana (Real España)
  Danilo Tosello (Olimpia)

6 goals

  José Francisco Ramírez (Platense)
  José Pacini (Real España)

5 goals

  Eddy Vega (Platense)
  Rudy Lormera (Universidad)

4 goals

  Milton Núñez (Marathón)
  Mario Berríos (Marathón)
  Santiago Autino (Valencia)
  Charles de Oliveira (Atlético Olanchano)
  Carlos Morán (Victoria)

3 goals

  Limbert Pérez (Universidad)
  Elvis Scott (Olimpia)
  Elmer Montoya (Motagua)
  Dirkmart Hernández (Vida)
  Edgar Nuñez (Real España)
  Pompilio Cacho (Motagua)
  Meilin Soto (Valencia)
  Jesús Navas (Olimpia)

2 goals

  Nery Medina (Motagua)
  Jairo Martínez (Motagua)
  Luis Rodas (Motagua)
  Marvin Chávez (Victoria)
  Emil Martínez (Marathón)
  Walter Hernández (Real España)
  Enrique Renau (Vida)
  José Navarro (Vida)
  Luis Oseguera (Vida)
  Jorge Ocampo (Vida)
  Diego de Rosa (Vida)
  Mario Peri (Atlético Olanchano)
  Denilson Costa (Marathón)
  José Güity (Marathón)
  Jerry Palacios (Olimpia)
  Mario César Rodríguez (Platense)
  Lucio Argueta (Platense)
  Juan Manuel Cárcamo (Olimpia)
  Mauricio Castro (Valencia)
  Darwin Pacheco (Marathón)

1 goal

  Mauricio Sabillón (Marathón)
  Nelson Morales (Victoria)
  Walter Martínez (Marathón)
  Clifford Laing (Real España)

Clausura

Regular season

Standings

Results table

Final round

Semifinals

Olimpia vs Platense

 Olimpia won 4–1 on aggregate.

Marathón vs Universidad

 Marathón 1–1 Universidad on aggregate; Marathón won on better regular season performance.

Final

Olimpia vs Marathón

 Olimpia won 3–2 on aggregate.

Top goalscorers
 As of 29 May 2005
10 goals
  Francisco Ramírez (Platense)

Relegation table
Relegation was determined by the aggregate table of both Apertura and Clausura tournaments.

References

Liga Nacional de Fútbol Profesional de Honduras seasons
1
Honduras